Henry Scrope, 7th Baron Scrope of Bolton, KB, (c. 1480-1533) was son and heir of Henry Scrope, 6th Baron Scrope of Bolton.

Early life and marriage
His father died at some point in 1506; in November that year, Henry Scrope received livery of his inheritance on 15 November that year. Henry VIII was crowned King of England on 23 June 1509, and at which occasion Henry Scrope was made a Knight Banneret.

Career
He was present at the Battle of Flodden in 1513, and was subsequently summoned to parliament between 1514 and 29. He continued to serve on the border in the early 1520s, being at Newcastle in the company of the earl of Surrey in 1523. He attended to various aspects of royal administration in Yorkshire, including a commission of the peace in 1512, assessing the taxable population ahead of the 1527 subsidy, and was in attendance on the Scottish Queen, Margaret Tudor. He supported King Henry's attempt to divorce Katherine of Aragon, being a signatory to a 13 July 1530 letter from the Lords Spiritual and Temporal to Pope Clement VII, pleading the king's case. In the early 1530s, Scrope was under pressure from King Henry to sell his 'Pisho' estate in Hertfordshire to the king, who desired to augment his royal Hunsdon lordship. This manor had been held by the Scrope family since 1393, and Henry Scrope wanted to swap it for other lands rather than sell it for cash, and it seems likely that he bribed Cromwell to reach this end, though Cromwell did not accept the bribe. Scrope had died, however, before negotiations were complete.

Marriages
Henry Scrope appears to have married, at the age of fourteen, his cousin Alice Scrope (who was aged approximately 12). She was, suo jure, Baroness Scrope of Masham, her father being Thomas Scrope, 6th Lord Scrope of Masham and her mother, Elizabeth, who was a daughter of John Neville, Marquess Montagu. Alice was dead by 1510, and at some point, Henry Scrope married a second time. This was to another member of the Yorkshire nobility, Mabel, daughter of Thomas, Lord Dacre of Gisland, herself Baroness Greystoke in own right.

Death
He died, between October and December 1533, and was buried alongside his ancestors, in Wensley, North Yorkshire. His second wife outlived him. He had had no children by his first marriage, but had three sons by Mabel, the eldest of whom, John, succeeded him to the barony, and who the year after his father died, concluded the Pisho estate negotiations, being 'eventually forced to settle for money rather than land' from the crown.

Letters between his father-in-law and Lady Maud Parr for the marriage of his son (and heir), Henry le Scrope, to her daughter, Catherine Parr survive. The marriage never happened as Scrope wasn’t sold on it, but she would go on to become queen consort to King Henry VIII. The younger Henry would die young, never fulfilling his father’s titles.

Ancestry

References

Henry
1480s births
1533 deaths
7